The Taiping Heavenly Kingdom (18511864) was a Chinese Christian theocratic absolute monarchy which sought to overthrow the Qing dynasty. The Heavenly Kingdom or Heavenly Dynasty, was led by King Hong Xiuquan and his followers. Its capital was at Tianjing (present-day Nanjing). The unsuccessful war it waged against the Qing is known as the Taiping Rebellion.

A self-proclaimed younger brother of Jesus Christ and convert to Protestant Christianity, Hong Xiuquan led an army that controlled a significant part of southern China during the middle of the 19th century, eventually expanding to a size of nearly 30 million people. The rebel kingdom announced social reforms and the replacement of Buddhism, Confucianism, Chinese folk religion, and Islam by his form of Christianity, holding that he was the second son of God and the younger brother of Jesus. The Taiping areas were besieged by Qing forces throughout most of the rebellion. The Qing government defeated the rebellion with the eventual aid of French and British forces.

Background

During the 19th century, the Qing dynasty experienced a series of famines, natural disasters, economic problems and defeats at the hands of foreign powers; these events have come to be collectively known as China's "century of humiliation". Farmers were heavily overtaxed, rents rose dramatically, and peasants started to desert their lands in droves. The Qing military had recently suffered a disastrous defeat in the First Opium War, while the Chinese economy was severely impacted by a trade imbalance caused by the large-scale and illicit importation of opium. Banditry became more common, and numerous secret societies and self-defence units formed, all of which led to an increase in small-scale warfare.

Protestant missionaries began working from Macao, Pazhou (known at the time as "Whampoa"), and Guangzhou ("Canton"). Their household staff and the printers they employed corrected and adapted the missionaries' message to reach the Chinese and they began to particularly frequent the prefectural and provincial examinations, where local scholars competed for the chance to rise to power in the imperial civil service. One of the native tracts, Liang's nine-part, 500-page tome called Good Words to Admonish the Age, found its way into the hands of Hong Xiuquan in the mid-1830s. Hong initially leafed through it without interest. After several failures during the examinations and a nervous breakdown, however, Hong told friends and family of a dream in which he was greeted by a golden-haired, bearded man and a younger man whom he addressed as "Elder Brother". He would also declare that he saw Confucius being punished by Hong's celestial father for leading the people astray. Hong worked another six years as a tutor before his brother convinced him that Liang's tract was worth examination. When he read the tract he saw his long-past dream in terms of Christian symbolism: he was the younger brother of Jesus and had met God the Father, Shangdi. He now felt it was his duty to restore the faith in the native Han religion and overthrow the Qing dynasty. He was joined by Yang Xiuqing, a former charcoal and firewood salesman of Guangxi, who claimed to act as a voice of the Supreme Emperor.

Feng Yunshan formed the Society of God Worshippers in Guangxi after a missionary journey there in 1844 to spread Hong's ideas. In 1847, Hong became the leader of the secret society. The Taiping faith, inspired by missionary Christianity, says one historian, "developed into a dynamic new Chinese religion... Taiping Christianity". Hong presented this religion as a revival and a restoration of the ancient classical faith in Shangdi. The sect's power grew in the late 1840s, initially suppressing groups of bandits and pirates, but persecution by Qing authorities spurred the movement into a guerrilla rebellion and then into civil war.

In some Marxist historiography, the Taiping Rebellion was viewed as a proto-communist uprising.

History and background

Early establishments
The Jintian Uprising began in 1850 in Guangxi. On 11 January 1851 (the 11th day of the 1st lunar month), incidentally Hong Xiuquan's birthday, Hong declared himself "Heavenly King" of a new dynasty, the "Heavenly Kingdom of Great Peace". After minor clashes, the violence escalated into the Jintian Uprising in February 1851, in which a 10,000-strong rebel army routed and defeated a smaller Qing force. Feng Yushan was to be the strategist of the rebellion and the administrator of the kingdom during its early days, until his death in 1852.

In 1853, the Taiping forces captured Nanjing, making it their capital and renaming it Tianjing ("Heavenly Capital"). Hong converted the office of the Viceroy of Liangjiang into his Palace of Heavenly King. Since Hong Xiuquan had been supposedly instructed in his dream to exterminate all "demons", which was what the Taipings considered the Manchus to be, thus they set out to kill the entire Manchu population. When Nanjing was occupied, the Taipings went on a rampage killing and burning 40,000 Manchus to death in the city. They first killed all the Manchu men, and then the Manchu women and Manchu children were burned to ashes.

At its height, the Heavenly Kingdom controlled south China, centred on the fertile Yangtze River Valley. Control of the river meant that the Taiping could easily supply their capital. From there, the Taiping rebels sent armies west into the upper reaches of the Yangtze, and north to capture Beijing, the capital of the Qing dynasty. The attempt to take Beijing failed.

Internal conflict
In 1853, Hong withdrew from active control of policies and administration, ruling exclusively by written proclamations often in religious language. Hong disagreed with Yang in certain matters of policy and became increasingly suspicious of Yang's ambitions, his extensive network of spies, and his declarations when "speaking as God". Yang and his family were put to death by Hong's followers in 1856, followed by the killing of troops loyal to Yang.

With their leader largely out of the picture, Taiping delegates tried to widen their popular support with the Chinese middle classes and forge alliances with European powers, but failed on both counts. The Europeans decided to stay neutral. Inside China, the rebellion faced resistance from the traditionalist middle class because of their hostility to Chinese customs and Confucian values. The land-owning upper class, unsettled by the Taiping rebels' peasant mannerisms and their policy of strict separation of the sexes, even for married couples, sided with the Qing forces and their Western allies.

In 1859, Hong Rengan, a cousin of Hong, joined the Taiping Rebellion in Nanjing, and was given considerable power by Hong. He developed an ambitious plan to expand the kingdom's boundaries. In 1860, the Taiping rebels were successful in taking Hangzhou and Suzhou to the east, but failed to take Shanghai, which marked the beginning of the decline of the Kingdom.

Fall

An attempt to take Shanghai in August 1860 was initially successful but finally repulsed by a force of Chinese troops and European officers under the command of Frederick Townsend Ward. This army would later become the "Ever Victorious Army", led by "Chinese" Gordon, and would be instrumental in the defeat of the Taiping rebels. Imperial forces were reorganised under the command of Zeng Guofan and Li Hongzhang, and the Qing government's reconquest began in earnest. By early 1864, Qing control in most areas was well established.

Hong declared that God would defend Nanjing, but in June 1864, with Qing forces approaching, he died of food poisoning as the result of eating wild vegetables as the city began to run out of food. He was sick for twenty days before the Qing forces could take the city. Although Hong likely died of his illness, suicide by poison has also been suggested. Only a few days after his death the Qing forces took the city. His body was buried and was later exhumed by Zeng to verify his death, and cremated. Hong's ashes were later blasted out of a cannon in order to ensure that his remains have no resting place as eternal punishment for the uprising.

Four months before the fall of the Taiping Heavenly Kingdom, Hong Xiuquan abdicated in favour of Hong Tianguifu, his eldest son, who was 14 years old then. Hong Tianguifu was unable to do anything to restore the kingdom, so the kingdom was quickly destroyed when Nanjing fell in July 1864 to Qing forces after vicious fighting in the streets. Most of the so-called princes were executed by Qing officials in Jinling Town, Nanjing.

Although the fall of Nanjing in 1864 marked the destruction of the Taiping regime, the fight was not yet over. There were still several thousands of Taiping rebel troops continuing the fight. It took seven years to finally put down all remnants of the Taiping Rebellion. In August 1871, the last Taiping rebel army, led by Shi Dakai's commander, Li Fuzhong, was completely wiped out by the Qing forces in the border region of Hunan, Guizhou, and Guangxi.

Administrative divisions
25 provinces were mentioned in Taiping Heavenly Kingdom sources:

Jiangnan Province or Heavenly Capital Province (天京省) – present-day northern area of Jiangsu
Anhui Province – present-day Anhui
Jiangxi Province – present-day Jiangxi
Hubei Province – present-day Hubei
Tianpu Province – present-day Pukou District, Nanjing
Sufu Province – present-day southern area of Jiangsu
Guifu Province – not clear
Zhejiang Heavenly Province – present-day Zhejiang
Hunan Province – present-day Hunan (de jure)
Fujian Province – present-day Fujian (de jure)
Henan Province – present-day Henan (de jure)
Shandong Province – present-day Shandong (de jure)
Shanxi Province – present-day Shanxi (de jure)
Zuili Province (lit. "criminal ruled") or Qianshan Province (lit. "promoting virtuous") – equal to Zhili; present-day Hebei, Beijing and Tianjin (de jure)
Guangxi Province – present-day Guangxi (de jure)
Guangdong Province – present-day Guangdong (de jure)
Yunnan Province – present-day Yunnan (de jure)
Sichuan Province – present-day Sichuan (de jure)
Guizhou Province – present-day Guizhou (de jure)
Shaanxi Province – present-day Shaanxi (de jure)
Gansu Province – present-day Gansu (de jure)
Fengtian Province – present-day Liaoning (de jure)
Jilin Province – present-day Jilin (de jure)
Wulongjiang Province – present-day Heilongjiang (de jure)
Yili Province – present-day Xinjiang (de jure)

Kings, princes, and noble ranks

The Heavenly King was the highest position in the Heavenly Kingdom. The sole people to hold this position were Hong Xiuquan and his son Hong Tianguifu:

Ranked below the "King of Heaven" Hong Xiuquan, the territory was divided among provincial rulers called kings or princes; initially there were fivethe Kings of the Four Cardinal Directions and the Flank King). Of the original rulers, the West King and South King were killed in combat in 1852. The East King was murdered by the North King during a coup in 1856, and the North King himself was subsequently killed. The Kings' names were:
 South King, Feng Yunshan (died 1852)
 East King, Yang Xiuqing (died 1856)
 West King, Xiao Chaogui (died 1852)
 North King, Wei Changhui (died 1856)
 Flank King, Shi Dakai (captured and executed by Qing forces in 1863)

The later leaders of the movement were 'Princes':
 Zhong Prince, Li Xiucheng (1823–1864, captured and executed by Qing forces)
 Ying Prince, Chen Yucheng (1837–1862)
 Gan Prince, Hong Rengan (1822–1864; cousin of Hong Xiuquan, executed)
 Jun Prince, Lai Wenkwok (1827–1868)
 Fu Prince, Hong Renda (Hong Xiuquan's second-eldest brother; executed by Qing forces in 1864)
 Tian Gui (executed in 1864)

Other princes include:
 An Prince, Hong Renfa, Hong Xiuquan's eldest brother
 Yong Prince, Hong Rengui
 Fu Prince, Hong Renfu

Leaders of concurrent rebellions were similarly granted the title of King, such Lan Chaozhu, a leader in the Li Yonghe rebellion in Sichuan.

In the later years of the Taiping Rebellion, the territory was divided among many, for a time into the dozens, of provincial rulers called princes, depending on the whims of Hong.

Captured areas in Jiangsu were called "Sufu Province".

Policies

Within the land that it controlled, the Taiping Heavenly Army established a totalitarian, theocratic, and highly militarised rule.
 The subject of study for the examinations for officials changed from the Confucian classics to the Bible.
 Private property ownership was abolished and all land was held and distributed by the state.
 A solar calendar replaced the lunar calendar.
 Foot binding was banned. (The Hakka people had never followed this tradition, and consequently the Hakka women had always been able to work the fields.)
 Society was declared classless and the sexes were declared equal. At one point, for the first time in Chinese history civil service exams were held for women. Some sources record that Fu Shanxiang, an educated woman from Nanjing, passed them and became an official at the court of the Eastern King.
Several women served as military officers and commanders under Taiping, Hong Xuanjiao (sister of Taiping leader), Su Sanniang and Qin Ersao are examples of women who acted actively as leaders during the Taiping Rebellion.
 The sexes were rigorously separated. There were separate army units consisting of women only; until 1855, not even married couples were allowed to live together or have sexual relations.
 The Qing-dictated queue hairstyle was abandoned in favour of wearing the hair long.
 Other new laws were promulgated including the prohibition of opium, gambling, tobacco, alcohol, polygamy (including concubinage), slavery and prostitution. These all carried death penalties.

Hong Rengan's proposed reforms
In 1859 the Gan Prince Hong Rengan, with the approval of his cousin the Heavenly King, advocated several new policies, including:

 Promoting the adoption of railways by granting patents for the introduction of locomotives; 21 railways were planned for each of the 21 provinces.
 Promoting the adoption of steamships for commerce and defence.
 Establishment of currency-issuing private banks.
 Granting of 10-year patents for introduction of new inventions, 5-year for minor items.
 Establishment of a National Postal Service.
 Promoting mineral exploration by granting control and twenty per cent of the revenue to the discoverers of deposits.
 Introduction of governmental investigative officers.
 Introduction of independent impartial state media officers for reporting and disseminating news.
 Institution of district treasuries and paymasters to manage finances.

Military procurement

While the Taiping rebels did not have the support of Western governments, they were relatively modernised in terms of weapons. An ever growing number of Western weapons dealers and black marketeers sold Western weapons such as modern muskets, rifles, and cannons to the rebels. As early as 1853, Taiping Tianguo soldiers had been using guns and ammunition sold by Westerners. Rifles and gunpowder were smuggled into China by English and American traders as "snuff and umbrellas". They were partially equipped with surplus equipment sold by various Western companies and military units' stores, both small arms and artillery. One shipment of weaponry from an American dealer in April 1862 already "well known for their dealings with rebels" was listed as 2,783 (percussion cap) muskets, 66 carbines, 4 rifles, and 895 field artillery guns, as well as carrying passports signed by the Loyal King. Almost two months later, a ship was stopped with 48 cases of muskets, and another ship with 5000 muskets. Mercenaries from the West also joined the Taiping forces, though most were motivated by opportunities for plunder during the rebellion rather than joining for ideological reasons. The Taiping forces constructed iron foundries where they were making heavy cannons, described by Westerners as vastly superior to Qing cannons. Just before his execution, Taiping Loyal King Li Xiucheng advised his enemies that war with the Western powers was coming and the Qing must buy the best Western cannons and gun carriages, and have the best Chinese craftsmen learn to build exact copies, teaching other craftsmen as well.

Religious affairs

Initially, the followers of Hong Xiuquan were called God Worshippers. Hong's faith was inspired by visions he reported in which the Shangdi, the Supreme Emperor, or Jehovah, greeted him in Heaven. Hong had earlier been in contact with Protestant missionaries and read the Bible. The Taiping Heavenly Kingdom was based on Hong Xiuquan's  syncretism with Christianity, which differed from mainstream Christian prayers, rituals, and holidays. The libraries of the Buddhist monasteries were destroyed, almost completely in the case of the Yangtze Delta area. Temples of Daoism, Confucianism, and other traditional beliefs were often converted to churches, schools or hospitals or defaced.

In letters to missionary Joseph Edkins, Hong rejected the Nicene Creed and said Arius was correct.

Foreign affairs 
The Heavenly Kingdom maintained the concept of the imperial Chinese tributary system in mandating all of the "ten thousand nations in the world" to submit and make the annual tribute missions to the Heavenly Court. The Heavenly King proclaimed that he intended to establish a new dynasty of China.

Currency 

In its first year, the Taiping Heavenly Kingdom minted coins that were 23 mm to 26 mm in diameter, weighing around 4.1 g. The kingdom's name was inscribed on the obverse and "Holy Treasure" on the reverse; the kingdom also issued paper notes.

Impact on the Hakkas
With the collapse of the Taiping Heavenly Kingdom, the Qing dynasty launched waves of massacres against the Hakkas, killing 30,000 Hakkas each day throughout China during the height of the Hakka massacres. Similar purges were taken while defeating the Red Turban Rebellion (1854–1856). In Guangdong, Governor Ye Mingchen oversaw the execution of 70,000 people in Guangzhou, eventually one million people were killed throughout central Guangdong. Another major impact was the bloody Punti-Hakka Clan Wars (1855 and 1867), which would cause the deaths of a million people. The Cantonese opera was purged clean.

See also
 Millennarianism in colonial societies

Notes

References

Citations

Sources 

 Works cited

Further reading 
For a fuller selection, please see the section Taiping Rebellion: Further reading
  Narrative history, with emphasis on the military aspects.
 .

External links
 撕下历史的 "面膜"读潘旭澜教授《太平杂说》 

 
Former countries in Chinese history
States and territories established in 1851
States and territories disestablished in 1864
19th century in China
19th-century rebellions
Rebellions in the Qing dynasty
Taiping Rebellion
Christianity in China
Former theocracies
Peasant revolts
Civil wars involving the states and peoples of Asia
Civil wars of the Industrial era
1851 establishments in China
1864 disestablishments in China
Millenarianism
Monarchism in China
Former monarchies of Asia
Former kingdoms